Rolando Pintoy Dantes (June 15, 1940 – March 16, 2009) was an actor, champion bodybuilder and Filipino martial artist who trained with Remy Presas for over 30 years.

He was born on June 15, 1940 in the Philippines.

He has also trained with other martial arts masters, such as Cacoy Canete and Edgar Sulite.  He worked several years as a police officer before becoming an actor.

He is one of the best-known Philippine actors. He has had leading roles in different films including "The Pacific Connection" and "Arnis: The Sticks Of Death." In addition, Dantes was a bodybuilder who won the "Mr. Philippines" title five times between 1971–1980 and placed in competitions for the titles "Mr. Universe" and "Mr. World".

Grand Master Dantes died on March 16, 2009.  He was 68.

Filmography

See also
Bodybuilding in the Philippines

References

External links

Report of his death

2009 deaths
1941 births
Filipino eskrimadors
Filipino male film actors
Filipino bodybuilders
University of the East alumni